Gerhard Tschierschnitz, known as René Carol (Berlin, 11 April 1920 - Minden, 9 April 1978), was a German Schlager singer of the 1950s and 1960s.

Hit singles 
Song title, year, German chart placement (all on Polydor)

Maria aus Bahia, 1948
Sarina, 20 April 1950, Philips PH 4003a
 Mandolino, Mandolino, 20 April 1950, Philips PH 4003b
 La-le-lu, 1951 (with Lonny Kellner)
 Im Hafen von Adano, 1951 (with Lonny Kellner)
 Rote Rosen, Rote Lippen, Roter Wein, 1953 (first gold record)
 Bella, Bella Donna, 1953
 Es blüht eine weisse Lilie, 1953
 Kein Land kann schöner sein, 1960
 Das Schiff deiner Sehnsucht, 1960
 Mitten im Meer, 1960
 Hafenmarie, 1961
 Ein Vagabundenherz, 1961
 Der rote Wein, 1962
 Das macht der Sonnenschein, 1962
 Prinzessin Sonnenschein, 1963
 Bianca Rosa, 1964
 Wenn einmal in fernen Tagen, 1967
 Sie war meine Marianne, 1971
 Liebe und Wein, 1972

References

1920 births
1978 deaths
20th-century German male singers